Eckhard Gnodtke (born 7 January 1958) is a German politician. Born in Lüchow, Lower Saxony, he represents the CDU. Eckhard Gnodtke has served as a member of the Bundestag from the state of Saxony-Anhalt since 2017.

Life 
He became member of the bundestag after the 2017 German federal election. He is a member of the defense committee.

References

External links 

  
 Bundestag biography 

1958 births
Living people
Members of the Bundestag for Saxony-Anhalt
Members of the Bundestag 2017–2021
Members of the Bundestag for the Christian Democratic Union of Germany